Giampaolo Caruso (born 15 August 1980) is an Italian former professional road bicycle racer, who rode professionally between 2002 and 2015 for the , , ,  and  squads.

Career
Born in Avola, Caruso was accused in the Operación Puerto doping case, but his case was soon dropped by the Spanish federation. The Italian Olympic Committee wanted him suspended for two years, but he was acquitted of involvement by the Court for Arbitration for Sport.

Ceramica Flaminia

Team Katusha
The Team Katusha signed him mainly in order to put him at the head of the team in the Giro d'Italia. In late 2011 he prolonged his contract for the upcoming season. During Stage 3 of the 2012 Tour de France many riders were involved in a crash this led to Caruso having scrapes from another riders chainring on his chest, he continued in the tour all the way to Paris.
Caruso rounded the final corner of the 2014 Liège–Bastogne–Liège in first position only to be overtaken by winner Simon Gerrans, Alejandro Valverde and Michał Kwiatkowski to finish fourth in the monument. On stage two of the 2014 Giro d'Italia Caruso crashed heavily in a feedzone which he went to hospital for but didn't pull out of the race until stage 6. In August 2014  announced they had extended Caruso's contract through to the end of 2016. Caruso's only one-day race win came at the 2014 Milano–Torino where he beat Rinaldo Nocentini to the finish line by three seconds.

In August 2015, it was announced that Caruso had returned a positive test for EPO in March, 2012. He was given a two-year ban.

Major results

2000
 1st Giro del Belvedere
 3rd Gran Premio di Poggiana
2001
 1st  Road race, UEC European Under-23 Road Championships
 2nd  Road race, UCI Under-23 Road World Championships
 2nd Trofeo Banca Popolare di Vicenza
 3rd Giro del Belvedere
 4th Trofeo Alcide Degasperi
 5th Gran Premio Palio del Recioto
2002
 8th Overall Tour de l'Avenir
 9th Overall Paris–Corrèze
2003
4th Overall Tour Down Under
1st Stage 5
4th Overall Vuelta a Andalucía
2004
 10th Amstel Gold Race
 10th Prueba Villafranca de Ordizia
2005
 4th Giro di Lombardia
2006
 8th Overall Tour de Suisse
2007
 5th Overall Tour of Slovenia
2008
 5th Overall Tour of Austria
 5th Giro dell'Emilia
 6th Overall Euskal Bizikleta
 8th Coppa Placci
 10th Overall GP CTT Correios de Portugal
 10th Giro dell'Appennino
2009
 1st  Overall Brixia Tour
1st Stages 1b, 2 & 4
 3rd Overall Route du Sud
 4th Gran Premio Città di Camaiore
 5th Trofeo Melinda
 7th Overall Tour of Austria
 7th Overall Giro del Trentino
 7th Giro dell'Appennino
 9th Giro della Provincia di Reggio Calabria
 10th Overall Settimana Internazionale di Coppi e Bartali
2010
 7th Overall Vuelta a Burgos
1st Stage 3 (TTT)
 10th Giro di Lombardia
2012
3rd Trofeo Melinda
2013
 4th Overall Vuelta a Burgos
 5th GP Miguel Induráin
 7th Gran Premio Industria e Commercio di Prato
 9th Gran Premio Città di Camaiore
 9th Strade Bianche
2014
 1st Milano–Torino
 4th Liège–Bastogne–Liège
2015
 6th Cadel Evans Great Ocean Road Race
 10th Strade Bianche

Grand Tour general classification results timeline

See also
List of doping cases in cycling

References

External links 

1980 births
Doping cases in cycling
Living people
People from Avola
Italian male cyclists
Sportspeople from the Province of Syracuse
Cyclists from Sicily